Pniewo  is a village in the administrative district of Gmina Zatory, within Pułtusk County, Masovian Voivodeship, in east-central Poland.

Pniewo was a private church village within the Polish Crown, administratively located in the Masovian Voivodeship in the Greater Poland Province of the Polish Crown.

During the German invasion of Poland, which started World War II, on September 9, 1939, Wehrmacht troops murdered a dozen or so Poles from the nearby town of Wyszków near the village (see also Nazi crimes against the Polish nation).

References

Villages in Pułtusk County